Virus is an Argentine new wave music band founded in 1979, led by Federico Moura until his death on December 21, 1988, from AIDS-related complications. His brother Marcelo then became lead singer, until the band gave its final performance on September 29, 1990, in a support slot to David Bowie. Virus reunited in 1994 and has had some sporadic activity, without recovering its previous popularity. Their latest album, Caja Negra (2006) features live versions of their classics, together with five new studio tracks, with invited artists influenced by the band: Ale Sergi (Miranda!), Adrián Dárgelos (Babasónicos), Pity Álvarez (Intoxicados) and Ciro Pertusi (Attaque 77).

Roberto Jacoby wrote the group's lyrics from its beginning. Some of their best-known songs are Wadu Wadu, El rock en mi forma de ser, Hay que salir del agujero interior, Una luna de miel en la mano, Amor descartable, Imágenes paganas and Mirada Speed.

History

Beginnings
The history of the Virus band dates back to 1979, when the Marabunta band decided to merge with the Las Violetas band to create a new group called "Duro", a band made up of Laura Gallegos (vocals), Julio Moura (guitar and backing vocals), Ricardo Serra (guitar), Marcelo Moura (percussion and backing vocals), Mario Serra (drums) and Enrique Mugetti (bass).

While they were satisfied with the sound of their music, they believed that they should have a male singer, so they started looking for a new singer. They finally asked Federico Moura to be the new singer and leader of the group, a request that Federico Moura accepted. Later Federico, decided to return to Argentina. Laura Gallegos left the position of singer in the band, and Marcelo Moura went from percussion to keyboards, however Mario Serra continued to be the band's drummer. Before going to look for Federico Moura in Brazil, Julio and Moura worked as qualified painters in the more affluent area of City Bell.

With Federico as singer, the band decided to change the name "Duro" to "Virus". The new name arose because Julio Moura had contracted a strong flu on a trip and his friends joked with him, saying "Virus". The band rehearsed intensively for a year, and officially debuted on January 11, 1980, at a club in the city of La Plata, just the same day that Marcelo turned 20.

On September 21, 1981, Virus made their first public presentation at the Prima Rock Festival, in Ezeiza, Buenos Aires. At that festival, the sound and aesthetics of Virus were not well received by the audience that attended (who were almost entirely hippies). The attendees began to throw oranges at them and turned their backs on them. As Federico kicked the oranges aimed at him, he provoked the audience by saying, "I'll lift' my ass off the floor, and we danced a bit. Show how you make your legs shake!". According to Marcelo Moura's stories, I walk down the stage crying Federico told him: "Boludo (phrase commonly used in Argentina), didn't you realize that while they threw oranges at us they were dancing?."

Members
 Current members
Marcelo Moura — lead vocals (1987–present), keyboards, synthesizers, piano, percussion, vocals (1980-2004), bass, guitar (1995-2006)
Julio Moura — guitar, percussion, vocals (1980–present), keyboards (1980-2009)
Daniel Sbarra — guitar, keyboards, synthesizers, percussion, backing vocals 1984–1988, 1994–present)
Ariel Naon — bass, contrabass, backing vocals (2006–present), guitar, keyboards (2009–present)
Fernando Monteleone — keyboards, synthesizers, programming, backing vocals (2006–present)
Nicolás Méndez — drums, percussion (2009–present)

 Former members
Federico Moura — lead vocals, guitar, bass, keyboards, synthesizers, percussion (1980-1987, died 1988)
Ricardo Serra — guitar, backing vocals (1980-1984)
Pablo Mugica — bass, percussion, backing vocals (1989-1990)
Enrique Mugetti — bass (1980-1989, 1994–2004), keyboards, synthesizers, backing vocals (1980-2004), guitar (1995-2004)
Mario Serra — drums, percussion, backing vocals (1980-1995)
Aitor Graña — drums, percussion, programming (1995-2006)
Ludo Isod — drums, percussion (2006-2009)
Patricio Fontana — keyboards, synthesizers (1994-1995), bass, guitar (1995-2004)

Discography
 Wadu-Wadu (1981)
 Recrudece (1982)
 Agujero interior (1983)
 Relax (1984)
 Locura (1985)
 Virus vivo (1986)
 Superficies de placer (1987)
 Tierra del fuego (1989)
 Virus vivo 2 (1997, recorded 1986)
 Nueve (1998)
 Obras cumbres (2000). Compilation.
 Caja negra (2006). Live collaborations + five new studio tracks

References

Sources 
 Argentine Rock Website (in Spanish)

External links 

Argentine rock music groups
Argentine new wave musical groups
Rock en Español music groups